The Amilcar CC was a light sporting car produced by the French Amilcar company from 1922 to 1925. It was powered by a 903 cc four-cylinder, side-valve engine generating 18 bhp.

References

Amilcar vehicles
Vehicles introduced in 1922